K38 Water Safety teaches public and federal safety agencies such as lifeguards, military, fire rescue, and law enforcement how to operate personal water craft (PWC), Jet Skis, Kawasaki Heavy Industries, Waverunners, Aquatrax, PWC or RWC (Rescue Water Craft).  K38 teaches personal water craft rescue training in swiftwater rescue, big wave surfing, tow-in surfers, law enforcement, lifesavers, and federal agencies such as United States Navy, United States Marines, United States Coast Guard, U.S. Border Patrol BORSTAR units and Pararescue.

K38 was founded by Shawn Alladio. She is a fourth-generation Santa Ana High School Graduate S.A.H.S. Class of 1979.
Ms. Alladio began teaching in 1989 in Southern California. She purchased her first Kawasaki Jet Ski stand-up in 1979 and became an International Jet Sports Boating Association Professional Racer in 1989. The K38 Way of Training has revolutionized lifesaving around the world with the training standards and applications of personal watercraft, with or without the use of a rescue board that is attached to the stern section of the boat to extricate patients or victims in water incidents. K38 Rescue has trained thousands of agencies worldwide. Shawn Alladio has received numerous awards for her educational and lifesaving efforts.

K38 Water Safety's training programs are for lifesaving purposes using personal watercraft as the best method of insertion to help lifesavers save not only their life, but others in the aquatic environment. The K38 training program evolved over 20 years. There are International K38 affiliates.

Along with a cadre of professional boating safety instructors, K38 Rescue teaches PWC and RWC courses in swiftwater rescue, flood, open water, surf, lake for recreational and occupational lifesavers.  K38 Water Safety has been instrumental in setting the standards for these small boats for lifesaving and rescue use working closely with boating safety associations and government agencies.

Jon Lee Anderson, a writer for the New Yorker Magazine, rode along with Alladio on her Waverunner the week following the flooding in New Orleans after Hurricane Katrina. He wrote a story called 'Leaving Desire – The Ninth Ward after the Hurricane' in 2005. Shawn and K38 worked in the lower ninth ward.

Distinctions

California Department of Boating and Waterways appointed Shawn Alladio to a task force from 1993 to 2010. Shawn Alladio is a PWC law enforcement P.O.S.T. (Peace Officer Standard of Training) boating safety instructor for the California Department of Boating and Waterways 2009–2010 under the guidance of Ms. Mary Thomas.

Since 1996, K38 has been heading up the International Jet Sports Boating Association World Finals for course marshal training and event safety management at Lake Havasu, Arizona, USA.  Shawn Alladio is the IJSBA Water Safety Director.

K38 and Shawn Alladio were awarded the 1998 National Water Safety Congress Regional Award from the WSC. and the National Safe Boating Council.

K38's Shawn Alladio was featured in Reader's Digest by Peter Michelmore for 'Everyday Heroes' called 'Killer Wave', 2003. The feature photo was taken by Time Life photographer Joe McNally.

In 2004, Paul Schulte created along with partners, Alladio, Kyla Dominguez and Ryan Smith an action sports clothing line called Liquid Militia.

The American Watercraft Association formed a partnership with K38 Rescue for occupational personal water craft users called the H2O Responders in 2007.  K38 also supports the educational efforts with the American Watercraft Association (AWA), NASBLA and Personal Watercraft Industry Association.. K38 Water Safety promotes the Kawasaki 'Law Loan Program' to public safety agencies who use personal water craft within the United States. This program is a successful 20-year ongoing voluntary program with local participating Kawasaki dealerships nationwide in the United States.

K38 International is officially recognized through authorized affiliates:  K38 Oceania, K38 Japan, K38 Italy, K38 Poland, K38 UK, K38 Portugal, K38 Spain, K38 Taiwan, K38 Belgium, K38 South America, K38 Scandinavia, K38 Canary Islands.

K38 International Awards for Personal Watercraft Lifesaving

K38 awarded inaugural recipients on the prestigious PWC boating safety commendations on October 7 in Lake Havasu, Arizona, the award recipients are all follows:

K38 Phoenix – Mr. Masayuki Imazaki for the rescues of over 200 Japanese citizens during the 2011 Tōhoku earthquake and tsunami(東日本大震災, Higashi Nihon Daishinsai)
K38 Heavy Water Award to Doug Knutzen, Eduardo Mendez and Will Green for the recovery of Dale Ostrander, Washington
K38 Legacy to Brad Southworth 'The Founding Father of PWC Rescue'.
K38 Everyday Heroes to Don Curry and Ed Guzman for a rescue of 2 persons in the surfzone in Morro Bay, CA., and Matthew Krizan and Russell Ord for the rescue of Jacob Trette at the big wave surf location Mavericks in Pillar Point, CA.  K38 Appreciation Awards to Mr. David Tew, Mr. Russell Libby, Mr. Aaron Cress and Mr. Brian Largarticha for their unselfish support of others.
[File:K38 Awards Video
K38 International PWC Awards

Rescue Water Craft Background History

The United States paved the way for using personal watercraft for rescues and patrols. In water rescue applications, they are referred to as 'rescue water craft' (RWC). This began in the late 1970s through the efforts of Kawasaki Motors Corporation U.S.A. The origin of water rescue using PWC's is attributed to these founding fathers:  Brad Southworth and Ronny Kling.  Former Vietnam Veterans and racers whom were asked by Chuck Koontz to provide a rescue application using stand up Jet Skis for the United States Jet Ski Association, which later became the International Jet Sports Boating Association. In 1985 Brad and Ronny began using the 'Fun Tech Wedge' on stand ups, a plastic form that fit around the circumference of the craft making it a more stable rescue platform.  From the Fun Tech Wedge, backboards, litters, modified paddle, body boards, and lines taken to victims and survivors were utilized as transport devices. In the late 1980s rescue board designs adapted to the changing hull designs when two to three-seater craft became available. This became common use for extrication of patients.

The first agencies to receive Jet Skis were Long Beach and Huntington Beach City Lifeguard departments in California.  Brad Southworth and Steve Strickland were hired by Kawasaki on a 'Tropical Tan Tour' to go to lifeguard agencies on the East and West coasts for the purpose of using them on their beaches.  Few agencies during this time applied the stands ups to actual rescue safety applications, but the product was given exposure at local beaches to the public.

The pioneering agencies who have the longest standing tradition of PWC in the United States are Kill Devil Hills Lifeguard Beach Service from North Carolina on the Outer Banks and Taft-Nelson-Delake (TND) Volunteer Fire Rescue Squad out of Lincoln City, Oregon, USA. Both began in the late 1970s and have the distinction of the origins of our PWC rescue heritage.  TND incorporated into 'North Lincoln Fire and Rescue' and both agencies are still using Personal Water Craft in 2010 for operations, over 30 years. In the late 1980s the feasibility of using Jet Skis for rescues began to take on interest from lifeguards and law enforcement.  In 1989 Shawn Alladio began teaching under the name 'Watercraft Awareness Safety Program', after a 10-year development of training concepts and to preserve local riding areas in Southern California. Due to the rapid growth of PWC, her professional development was launched as the product sales increased. This program was eventually named K38 Water Safety. In 1990, the Personal Watercraft Industry Association created the 'Wave Rangers' program to expose law enforcement to these boats in the United States, this lasted a few seasons.

In 2008 Shawn Alladio was invited onto the PWCoffshore.com point-to-point personal water craft endurance race team competing on long-distance races called offshore powerboat racing under American Power Boat Association sanctioning. Shawn's first buoy race was in 1980, she has celebrated 30 years of PWC competition, focusing on Offshore and Endurance events, training racers and safety teams for these events. Shawn has competed in offshore PWC racing events ranging from 1,6000 miles to 60 miles since 1989. Such as the LB2CAT a long-standing race event from Long Beach, California to Catalina Island, Avalon and back to Long Beach, and the Mark Hahn 300 a 300-mile memorial endurance race.  Personal Water Craft racing incorporates many different disciplines, such as Closed Course, Obstacle, Sprints, Ovals, Offshore, Endurance, Raids, Slalom, Gran Prix, and Enduros.

In 2011, K38 partnered with the Phoenix Patriot Foundation to create the Phoenix 500 Races and the Purple Heart Patriots PWC Challenge which includes Military personnel who have received the Purple Heart in Afghanistan or Iraq.  These Military personnel operate Kawasaki Jet Ski watercraft in offshore and endurance race events.  The PPF directly supports severely wounded veterans enabling them to fully recover, reintegrate and remain engaged in serving America.

Shawn Alladio and K38 Water Safety received the 2005 National Water Safety Congress and National Safe Boating Council Nation Awards for reducing/preventing drowning's across the United States.

The IJSBA 2006 International Jet Sports Boating Association Hall of fame inaugural induction included Shawn Alladio as one of the original 25 recipients for her dedication to the sport.

National Water Safety Congress Award
(March 17, 2005) The National Water Safety Congress 'National Award' was awarded to Shawn Alladio, on March 16, 2005 in Newport Beach, California, at the International Boating Water Safety Summit to a standing ovation from Summit attendees, the National Water Safety Congress and the National Safe Boating Council bestows upon Shawn Alladio of K38 Water Safety the NATIONAL AWARD. In recognition of superior efforts, accomplishments and contributions to further and promote water safety on a national scare. In 1999, Shawn received the Regional Award for her efforts in education to reduce drownings and educational efforts for the personal watercraft boating community.

In 2006, Shawn Alladio from K38 was awarded a Special Commendation for relief work in the aftermath of 2005 Hurricane Katrina in New Orleans from the Higgins and Langley Memorial Awards for flood and swiftwater rescue. K38 supported 8 California urban search and rescue and rescue teams with human evacuations recovering over 2,500 persons. K38 was noted for animal rescue efforts using Jet Skis.

K38 awards

Awards include:
  1997 National Safe Boating Council – 'Partnership Award'
  1998 United States Marine Corps 'Raiders Appreciation Award' from Raid Division, NAB
  1999 National Water Safety Congress – 'National Award'
  1999 Certificate of Appreciation awarded in recognition of Exemplary Commitment and Outstanding Support in the Personal Watercraft 
Safety and Enforcement Section of the Department of Boating and Waterways Course
  2005 National Water Safety Congress – 'Regional Award'
  2005 Higgins and Langley Memorial Award for Flood and Swiftwater Rescue – 'Commendation Medal'
  2006 International Jet Sports Boating Association – Inaugural 'Hall of Fame' Inductee
  2009 'PWC Community Award for Valor'
  2009 'Warrior Award' from PWCoffshore.com
  2009 'Certificate of Heroism' Award- City of Mission Viejo Commendation
  2009 Orange County Fire Authority Certificate of Heroism 'Chiefs Award'
  2009 National Water Safety Congress Regional Award
  2009 Certificate of Heroism, City of Mission Viejo, California, Frank Ury-Mayor
  2009 American Watercraft Association and Parade of Nations – 'Safety Award'
  2010 United Warrior Survivor Foundation-K38 With sincere gratitude and appreciation for supporting Special Operations Survivors 
through United Warrior Survivor Foundation. September 11, 2010 Annual Survivors Conference, San Diego CA
  2011 National Safe Boating Council induction into the Boating Safety Hall of Fame
  2012 Alpha Company 4-160th Special Operations Aviation Regiment (SOAR) Mission Training certificate
  2014 USN-Naval Special Warfare-1st Phase BUDs Instructors-Paddle
  2016 Western States Boating Administrators Association – Hollister Award Recipient
  2016 USMC MARSOC MRV Paddle for Project Jackal, military development program
  2017 California Association of Harbor Masters and Port Captains-Distinguished Service Award for flood recovery working conducted 
during the aftermath of Hurricane Harvey in Texas
  2019 Portuguese Maritime Authority, Portugal. Comando Geral Da Policia Maritima Award
  2019 USMC Basic Reconnaissance, EWTGPAC Appreciation Paddle
  2020 Lifeguard Gydnia award, Poland

In 2009, the City of Mission Viejo in California awarded Shawn a certificate of heroism for her actions on I-5 freeway. Shawn received 1st and 2nd degree burns to her hands and stomach. Masahito Matasuura received 3rd degree burns, resulting in numerous surgeries. He recovered from the extent of his burns covering over 30% of his body.  On February 4, 2010, the Orange County Fire Authority (OCFA) honors Shawn with the 'Certificate of Heroism' at their 'Best and Bravest' Awards Ceremony.  She is given the 'Chief's Award' for rescuing Masahito from a burning vehicle.

Big wave surfing event safety background

In 1998, K38 and Shawn Alladio rescued Brazilian big wave surfer, Carlos Burle two times during the International Surfing Associations Reef @ Todos Big Wave Team Challenge Contest.

"The crowd exploded at the sight of Taylor Knox $50,000 ride', the heroics of Carlos Burle, and the numerous wipeouts and heroic rescue by Shawn Alladio of K-38."

In 1999, Shawn Alladio of K38 was appointed the International Surfing Association (ISA) Water Safety Director representing 48 countries worldwide.

Shawn Alladio along with Jonathan Cahill survived a set of 100' waves at the famous big wave surfing sport called Mavericks on November 21, 2001. The story was featured in the San Francisco Chronicle Newspaper. Powerline Productions featured Shawn Alladio in several documentaries on the famous big wave surfing break, such as '100' Wednesday', 'Whipped', "Considered by some to be the biggest day in big wave surfing history. They were featured in a Reader's Digest 'Everyday Heroes' article based on eyewitness accounts.

Shawn and K38 had a feature story titled 'Heavy Water' in Surfing's Greatest Misadventures – Dropping in on the Unexpected, edited by Paul Diamond, 2006. This story was based on the rescue of professional surfer Ian Armstrong at a big wave surfing location called Dungeons, during the Red Bull Big Wave Africa surfing contest waiting period.

Shark Park, The Heaviest Wave in California, a film by Greg Huglin was an expedition to the island of San Miguel in the Channel Islands of California off of Southern California. The expedition features professional towsurfers who used PWCs to catch and ride large waves.

Muscat Asian Beach Games organizing committee recognizes Shawn Alladio 'Chief of Water Safety-Jet Ski Racing', December 8–16, 2010, the Sultanate Of Oman

K38 – Big wave safety events
Shawn Alladio of K38, managed the water safety or training new staff to work big wave venues for rescues and recovery work at the following global events:

 1998 ISA/Reef Todos Santos Big Wave Challenge- Mexico 'Killers'
 1998–99 Quiksilver Men Who Ride Mountains-Mavericks, California, USA.
 1999 ISA Big Wave World Championships-Todos Santos, Baja Mexico "Killers'
 1999 Gotcha Pro-Teahupo'o, Tahiti. K38 Staff:  Vetea 'Poto' David, Nelson Armitage, Doneven Polendy, Alfredo Vilas-Boas, Andrew Kaufman
 2000 ISA Big Wave World Championships-Madeira, Portugal (Jardim do Mar)
 2000 Gotcha Pro-Teahupo'o, Tahiti  (Bodyboard and Women's events provided coverage during waiting period with Vetea David)
 2000 Red Bull Big Wave Africa-Cape Town, South Africa 'Dungeons'
 2003 Red Bull Big Wave Africa-Cape Town, South Africa 'Dungeons'
 2004 Red Bull Big Wave Africa, Cape Town, South Africa 'Dungeons'. K38 South Africa – Glenn Bee, Pierre du Plessis, Ross Lindsay, Greg Bertish, Grant Spooner
 2006 Nelscott Reef Tow In Classic, Lincoln City, Oregon, USA. Kanalu K38 – Pake Ah Mow, Jonathan Cahill. "Nelscott Reef".
 2007–2008 Towsurfing Adventures Water Safety for the Channel Islands Expeditions to Shark Park, California USA
 2008 Nelscott Reef Tow In Classic, Lincoln City, Oregon, USA.  "Nelscott Reef"
 2009–2010 Mavericks Surf Contest-Half Moon Bay, California USA, Water Safety Director. K38 – Mavericks Water Patrol:  Vince Broglio, Russell Smith, Ryan Augenstein, and Garrett McNamara. Staff: Jonathan Cahill, Mr. and Mrs. Levinson, David Pu'u K38 Mavericks Water Patrol
 2012 'The Mayan Apocalypse', Garrett McNamara's big wave surfing excursion to the Cortes Banks. K38 rescue team; RWC Coxswain Shawn Alladio and Brian Largarticha and Nik Hawks.  Boat safety staging, Guri Sejzer, Andrew Kroll and Jon Hoover on medical.

Publications
Publications of relevance include:

 Surfing's Greatest Misadventures by Paul Diamond Heavy Water Anything Wrong Comes to Death
 The Water Patrol by Linda Barr
 Leaving Desire by Jon Lee Anderson
 Surfing Women of the Waves by Linda Chase
 New Orleans for Dummies by Julie Kamsz
 Killer Waves by Peter Michelmore
 The Surfing Yearbook by Bruce Boal
 Saving Places by Sidney Dobrin
 Surfing South Africa by Steven Pike
 Letter from New Orleans – Holt McDougal Literature 8th grade school books, 500,000 published.
 The Wave – In pursuit of rouges, freaks and giants of the ocean; by Susan Casey

References

External links
 http://www.AWAhq.org,
 http://safeboatingcouncil.org,
 http://www.K38WaterSafety.com,
 http://www.dbw.ca.gov,
 http://www.K38rescue.com,
 http://www.TripleOverhead.com,
 http://www.NASBLA.org,
 http://www.higginsandlangley.org,
 http://www.PWCoffshore.com
  'Leaving Desire' by Jon Lee Anderson
 http://www.ocregister.com/news/alladio-232386-car-burning.html

Rescue
Training organizations